Laram Top also known as "Laram Sar" is a hill station in the Lower Dir District of Khyber Pakhtunkhwa, Pakistan at a distance of 30 km from Chakdara and 180 km from Peshawar. It is located at elevation of 7345 ft (2239 meters) above the sea level. it is the highest peak in dir (lower) and often known as “radar” because of multiple Radar being instilled there especially for communication purposes.

See also
Kumrat Valley
Jakar Baba Top

References

Lower Dir District
Tourism in Khyber Pakhtunkhwa
Hill stations in Pakistan
Tourist attractions in Khyber Pakhtunkhwa